Pulse pressure is the difference between systolic and diastolic blood pressure. It is measured in millimeters of mercury (mmHg). It represents the force that the heart generates each time it contracts. Normal pulse pressure is approximately 40 mmHg, whereas a pulse pressure that is less than 25% of the systolic pressure is low or narrowed, and a pulse pressure of greater than 100 mmHg is high or widened, although some sources consider a pulse pressure of 60 mmHg to be unusually high or wide, and a pulse pressure of 50 mmHg or more increases the risk of cardiovascular disease.

Calculation 
Pulse pressure is the (higher) systolic blood pressure minus the (lower) diastolic blood pressure.

The systemic pulse pressure is approximately proportional to stroke volume, or the amount of blood ejected from the left ventricle during systole (pump action) and inversely proportional to the compliance (similar to Elasticity) of the aorta.

The aorta has the highest compliance in the arterial system due in part to a relatively greater proportion of elastin fibers versus smooth muscle and collagen. This serves the important function of damping the pulsatile (max pump pressure) output of the left ventricle, thereby reducing the initial systolic pulse pressure but slightly raising the subsequent diastolic phase (a period rather similar to Dwell time). If the aorta becomes rigid because of disorders such as arteriosclerosis or atherosclerosis, the pulse pressure would be very high because the aorta becomes less compliant due to the formation of rigid lesions to the (otherwise flexible)  aorta wall.
 Systemic pulse pressure (SPP) (usually measured at upper right arm artery) = Psystolic - Pdiastolic
e.g. normal 120mmHg - 80mmHg = 40mmHg 
 low 107mmHg - 80mmHg = 27mmHg 
 high 160mmHg - 80mmHg = 80mmHg 
 Pulmonary pulse pressure (PAP) (Heart-Lung), is normally significant lower than systemic blood pressure due to the higher compliance of the pulmonary system compared to systemic circulation. It is measured by right heart catheterization or may be estimated by transthoracic echocardiography (TTE) Normal pulmonary artery pressure is between 8mmHg -20 mm Hg at rest.
 e.g. normal 15mmHg - 8mmHg = 7mmHg
 high 25mmHg - 10mmHg = 15mmHg

Values and variation

Low (narrow) 
A pulse pressure is considered abnormally low if it is less than 25% of the systolic value. If the pulse pressure is extremely low, i.e. 25 mmHg or less, it may indicate low stroke volume, as in Congestive Heart Failure and/or cardiogenic shock.

The most common cause of a low (narrow) pulse pressure is a drop in left ventricular stroke volume.
In trauma, a low or narrow pulse pressure suggests significant blood loss (insufficient preload leading to reduced cardiac output).

A narrow pulse pressure is also caused by aortic valve stenosis and cardiac tamponade.

High (wide)

From exercise 
Usually, the resting pulse pressure in healthy adults, sitting position, is approximately 40 mmHg. The pulse pressure increases with exercise due to increased stroke volume, healthy values being up to pulse pressures of about 100 mmHg, simultaneously as systemic vascular resistance drops during exercise. In healthy individuals the pulse pressure will typically return to normal within about 11 minutes.

For most individuals, during aerobic exercise, the systolic pressure progressively increases while the diastolic remains about the same. In some very aerobically athletic individuals, for example distance runners, the diastolic will progressively fall as the systolic increases. This behavior facilitates a much greater increase in stroke volume and cardiac output at a lower mean arterial pressure and enables much greater aerobic capacity and physical performance. The diastolic drop reflects a much greater fall in systemic vascular resistance of the muscle arterioles in response to the exercise (a greater proportion of red versus white muscle tissue). Individuals with larger BMIs due to increased muscle mass (bodybuilders) have also been shown to have lower diastolic pressures and larger pulse pressures.

Consistently high 
A pulse pressures of 50 mmHg or more can increase the risk of heart disease, heart rhythm disorders, stroke and other cardiovascular diseases and events. Higher pulse pressures are also thought to play a role in eye and kidney damage from diseases such as diabetes. If the usual resting pulse pressure is consistently greater than 100 mmHg, the most likely basis is stiffness of the major arteries, aortic regurgitation (a leak in the aortic valve), arteriovenous malformation (an extra path for blood to travel from a high pressure artery to a low pressure vein without the gradient of a capillary bed), hyperthyroidism or some combination. (A chronically increased stroke volume is also a technical possibility, but very rare in practice.)  While some drugs for hypertension have the side effect of increasing resting pulse pressure irreversibly, other antihypertensive drugs, such as ACE Inhibitors, have been shown to lower pulse pressure. A high resting pulse pressure is harmful and tends to accelerate the normal aging of body organs, particularly the heart, the brain and kidneys.  A high pulse pressure combined with bradycardia and an irregular breathing pattern is associated with increased intracranial pressure and should be reported to a physician immediately. This is known as Cushing's triad and can be seen in patients after head trauma related to increased intracranial pressure.

High sodium intake may cause high pulse pressure.

Some common causes of widening pulse pressure :

 Anemia
 Aortic dissection
 Atherosclerosis
 Arteriovenous fistula
 Chronic aortic regurgitation
 Aortic root aneurysm
 Aortic root dilation
 Beri beri
 Distributive shock
 Endocarditis
 Fever
 Heart block
 Increased intracranial pressure
 Patent ductus arteriosus
 Pregnancy
 Thyrotoxicosis

Clinical significance

Heart disease 
A meta-analysis study conducted in 2000, suggested that a high pulse pressure is an important risk factor for heart disease. The study, which combined the results of several studies of 8,000 elderly patients in all, found that a 10 mm Hg increase in pulse pressure was associated with a nearly 20% increased risk of cardiovascular mortality.  The authors of the meta-analysis concluded that in older hypertensive patients pulse pressure is an independent cardiovascular risk factor, especially for cardio mortality, and that pulse pressure, not mean pressure, is the major determinant of cardiovascular risk. They suggest that this helps to explain the apparent increase in risk sometimes associated with low diastolic pressure. The risks from increased pulse pressure apply to both men and women and even to treated hypertensive patients whose diastolic blood pressure was reduced to within the normal range. The authors note that vasopeptidase inhibitors and nitric oxide donors may possibly be useful to lower pulse pressure in patients with elevated pulse pressure by increasing the distensibility of the large arteries, however, their hypothesized benefit in terms of a reduction of cardiovascular morbidity and mortality still remains to be proven as of the time of the study.

Heightened pulse pressure is also a risk factor for the development of atrial fibrillation.

Awareness of pulse pressure on morbidity and mortality is lacking relative to the awareness of the effects of elevated systolic and diastolic blood pressure. However, Pulse pressure has usually been found to be a stronger independent predictor of cardiovascular events, especially in older populations, than has systolic, diastolic, or mean arterial pressure. It has only been since around the turn of the 21st century that studies began to be conducted into the effects of pulse pressure. One of the first such studies, a 2001 randomized, placebo-controlled trial of 1,292 male veterans, compared the effects of hydrochlorothiazide (a thiazide diuretic), atenolol (a beta-blocker), captopril (an ACE inhibitor), clonidine (a central α2-agonist), diltiazem (a calcium channel blocker), and prazosin (an α1-blocker) on pulse pressure and found that, after one year of treatment, hydrochlorothiazide was the most effective at lowering pulse pressure, with an average decrease of 8.6 mm Hg. Captopril and atenolol were tied as least effective, with an average decrease of 4.1 mm Hg. Clonidine (decrease of 6.3 mm Hg), diltiazem (decrease of 5.5 mm Hg), and prazosin (decrease of 5.0 mm Hg) were intermediate.

Psychotic disorders 
In a large study (N=1289) among patients with psychotic disorders researchers found that, when controlling for patients' age and cardiovascular disease status, body mass index (BMI) and employment status  predicted the likelihood of having elevated pulse pressure. Further, it was also found that elevated pulse pressure was (above 60 mm/Hg) mainly associated with the physical domains of functioning such as mobility and self-care.

See also 
 Mean arterial pressure
 Cold pressor test
 Hypertension
 Prehypertension
 Antihypertensive
 Patent ductus arteriosus

References 

Medical signs
Cardiovascular physiology